Yerai Couñago Vilaboa (born 11 January 1991), simply known as Yerai is a Spanish footballer playing for Arosa SC as a midfielder.

External links
 
 
 
 

1991 births
Living people
Association football midfielders
Footballers from Redondela
Tercera División players
Coruxo FC players
FC Honka players
Veikkausliiga players
Spanish footballers
Spanish expatriate footballers
Expatriate footballers in Finland
PK-35 Vantaa (men) players